Facing Future is the second album by Hawaiian singer Israel Kamakawiwoʻole, released in 1993. The best-selling album of all time by a Hawaiian artist, Facing Future combines traditional Hawaiian-language songs, hapa-haole songs with traditional instrumentation, and two Jawaiian (Island reggae) tracks.

The album's sales have been driven not only by its popularity with Hawaiian audiences but by its popularity in the mainland United States and around the world, particularly the track "Somewhere Over the Rainbow/What a Wonderful World," which has been used in various films (Finding Forrester, Meet Joe Black, 50 First Dates, Fred Claus, Hubble, Son of the Mask) television shows (ER, Cold Case, Jon & Kate Plus 8, Life On Mars, Glee, Scrubs) and commercials (eToys). Facing Future reached platinum status in 2005.

Track listing

Personnel
Israel Kamakawiwoʻole – ukulele, vocals
Del Beazley – guitar
Mel Amina – guitar
Gaylord Holomalia – keyboards, programming
Analu ʻAina – electric bass (uncredited)
Roland Cazimero – acoustic bass, guitar
Mike Muldoon – percussion

Production
Produced by Israel Kamakawiwoʻole and Jon de Mello
Engineered and mixed by Milan Bertosa
Mastered by Jon Golden

Charts and certifications

Charts

Year-end charts

Certifications and sales

References

External links
 

1993 albums
Israel Kamakawiwoʻole albums